Teretiopsis hyalina is a species of sea snail, a marine gastropod mollusk in the family Raphitomidae.

Description
The length of the shell attains 25.8 mm.

Distribution
This marine species was found off Wallis Island, Polynesia and off Fiji, Melanesia

References

 Sysoev, A.; Bouchet, P. (2001). Gastéropodes turriformes (Gastropoda: Conoidea) nouveaux ou peu connus du Sud-Ouest Pacifique = New and uncommon turriform gastropods (Gastropoda: Conoidea) from the South-West Pacific. in: Bouchet, P. et al. (Ed.) Tropical deep-sea benthos. Mémoires du Muséum national d'Histoire naturelle. Série A, Zoologie. 185: 271-320

External links
 MNHN, Paris: holotype
 

hyalina
Gastropods described in 2001